Nell Beecham  is an LGBT activist based in the United Kingdom, known for her work in the field of LGBT rights and feminism. Beecham has been linked to Stonewall (UK) for her work as a Youth Volunteer, establishing a number of LGBT youth projects in schools in North London.

Beecham later held the position of LGBT Officer at the University of York alongside filmmaker Thomas Paul Martin.

References 

Living people
British LGBT rights activists
1991 births